Lažánky is the name of several locations in the Czech Republic:

 Lažánky (Brno-Country District), a village in the South Moravian Region
 Lažánky (Strakonice District), a village in the South Bohemian Region